Chen Yaoye (Traditional: 陳耀燁; Simplified: 陈耀烨; Pinyin: Chén Yàoyè; born on December 16, 1989) is a Chinese professional Go player.

Biography 
Chen Yaoye was born in Beijing, China. He is a young Go player who, at the age of 16, had already beaten Lee Chang-ho, arguably the best Go player in the world. He has won a title, the 2005 National Go Individual with a record of 7 wins and 2 losses. At the time he was 15 years and 9 months of age, the youngest Chinese player to win the tournament. After beating Lee in the 10th LG Cup, he scored two more wins in that tournament to progress to the final. In March 2006, he faced off against Gu Li in the final of the 10th LG Cup. Chen had lost the first two matches, but won the next two games to tie it at 2–2. It came to the final fifth game, and Chen lost. He was promoted to 9 dan in 2007 after he was runner-up to Lee Sedol in the Asian TV Cup.

In June 2013, he defeated Lee Sedol in the 9th Chunlan Cup final by 2-1, winning his first international individual title.

Chen's style is characterised by his strong preference for early territory, much like Cho Chikun.

Promotion record

Titles & runners-up 
 
Tied for #5 in total number of titles in China.

Head-to-head record vs selected players

Players who have won international Go titles in bold.

 Park Junghwan 21:16
 Gu Li 20:11
 Choi Cheolhan 13:9
 Xie He 13:9
 Zhou Ruiyang 5:16
 Tuo Jiaxi 10:10
 Ke Jie 8:12
 Piao Wenyao 6:13
 Tan Xiao 10:9
 Lian Xiao 8:10
 Jiang Weijie 10:7
 Lee Sedol 8:8
 Qiu Jun 8:8
 Hu Yaoyu 7:9
 Gu Lingyi 13:2
 Kang Dongyun 10:5
 Shi Yue 5:10
 Wang Xi 9:5
 Li Zhe 6:8
 Kim Ji-seok 6:6
 Kong Jie 6:6
 Mi Yuting 4:8
 Tang Weixing 11:1
 Fan Tingyu 9:2

References

External links 
 Article about Chen Yaoye and Cho Hanseung at Go Game Guru

1989 births
Chinese Go players
Living people
Sportspeople from Beijing